Kuroshiovolva is a genus of sea snails, marine gastropod mollusks in the subfamily Aclyvolvinae of the family Ovulidae.

Species
Species within the genus Kuroshiovolva include:
Kuroshiovolva lacanientae Lorenz, 2009
Kuroshiovolva shingoi Azuma & Cate, 1971

References

 orenz F. & Fehse D. (2009) The living Ovulidae. A manual of the families of allied cowries: Ovulidae, Pediculariidae and Eocypraeidae. Hackenheim: Conchbooks

External links
 Azuma M. & Cate C.N. (1971). Sixteen new species and one new genus of Japanese Ovulidae. The Veliger. 13(3): 261–268.

Ovulidae